James Lewicki (December 13, 1917 – December 12, 1979) was a twentieth century American artist and illustrator who worked for many of the magazines of his day and extensively for Life (magazine). His book illustrations include The Life Treasury of American Folklore, The World We Live In (Life magazine), The Golden Bough written by Sir James Frazer and published by the Limited Editions Club (see The Heritage Press) and The Golden Book of Christmas Tales, written by his wife, Lillian. James also explored the Christmas theme in magazines and created cards for the American Artists Group.

Life and Works

Life History
James Lewicki, the second child of Ukrainian immigrants was born on December 13, 1917 in Buffalo, New York to Max and Alexandra Lewicki. His teachers recognized his talent from an early age and Jim went on to attend Buffalo Technical High School, the Albright–Knox Art Gallery, the Art School of the Detroit Society of Arts and Crafts (now College for Creative Studies), and Pratt Institute, where he graduated in Illustration in 1939.

He married Lillian Schalow in 1943, also an Illustration major at Pratt Institute, who partnered with him on many projects throughout his career as researcher, draftsman, studio assistant and secretary. They had two children, Roy Lewicki and Lisa Lewicki Hermanson. First living in Brooklyn, then Hollis, New York, they moved to Centerport, New York (on Long Island) in 1952, where they built a house and studio.

As an illustrator, Jim was always looking for a story to turn into pictures, and that included tapping personal experience. In 1952 he sold Life Goes Camping with the Lewickis to Life magazine, and in the 1970s wrote and illustrated The Territory for Yankee (magazine), based on his experiences with a cherished vacation home in the woods of northern Vermont.

When not working on illustration assignments, Jim enjoyed painting landscapes and sketching outdoors. He worked in watercolor up to the 1960s and later in acrylics. He exhibited annually with Audubon Artists and the American Watercolor Society and was a member of these two groups as well as Rotary International and the Society of Illustrators. Later, he did a series of graphite and pen drawings, as well as mixed media works in collage. Printmaking also became an outlet, producing etchings, monoprints, and working in dry lithography, a "green" process invented by his C.W. Post colleague, Harry Hoehn.

During the 1960s and 70’s Jim switched gears and became a professor, sharing his expertise with both graduate and undergraduate students in the Fine Arts Department of LIU Post (formerly known as the C.W. Post Campus of Long Island University).

Illustration career

Early Assignments
Jim completed his first book project while still at Pratt in 1939; From Village to Metropolis by R.W. Swan, a pictorial history of New York City from its early days as a Dutch settlement up through modern times.

Jim started to get work from Life magazine directly after Pratt, honing his skills with a wide variety technical black and white illustrations, many related to World War 2, such as Anatomy of Bombs. Jim also did quick spots for The New York Times on very short deadlines.

Christmas
In 1943, Jim entered a Christmas card competition; the challenge, to depict the Christmas message in a time of war, sponsored by the American Artists Group. His painting of a bombed out church, with a large stained glass window of a Madonna and Child miraculously preserved, won second prize.  Asked to do a commission the following year he recalled the Buffalo winters of his childhood, where a lighted paper star was paraded from house to house as carols were sung, following Ukrainian tradition. This led to a lifelong association with the theme of Christmas, starting with the series of cards, Christmas 'Round the World, also for American Artists Group. Additional research on the Christmas theme led to "The Customs of Christmas" for Life magazine.

Jim also made a rebus of The Night Before Christmas published by Hallmark Cards. Later on, he completed a pictorial essay for Life (magazine) - Christmas Legends.  These paintings later appeared in book form published by Simon and Schuster as The Golden Book of Christmas Tales, with the stories written by Lillian. Jim continued to produce Christmas cards in a variety of decorative styles for American Artists Group through the 1960s.

The World We Live In
A detailed record of nature is evident in Jim's paintings for the Life magazine series, The World We Live In, for which Jim was one of the featured illustrators. Jim's illustrations of undersea life appears on the cover and in Part 2, Miracle of the Sea, published on February 9, 1953, in Part 4, The Canopy of Air, published on June 8, 1953 and in Part 5, The Pageant of Life, published on September 7, 1953.

After running successfully in Life, The World We Live In was released in book form in 1955, for which Jim did the cover art - a dramatic scene of a full solar eclipse presiding over a landscape of all manner of living creatures.

American Folklore
It was while working on Christmas legends that a neighbor commented to Jim that the United States really had no strong tradition of folklore and cultural heritage. Jim went to the library to see if this was so, and found volumes to the contrary. He proposed the theme of folklore to Life magazine, and they asked for a dummy presentation of 12 pages. Jim found it impossible to condense it down to one article, so he suggested a series, and much to his surprise the editors agreed. This assignment lasted for five years. Legends from all over the country, representing the diverse cultures of Native Americans, early explorers, and immigrants were included, requiring an enormous amount of background research.  The final paintings were completed in a detailed egg tempera style on gesso panel, preceded by multiple color studies and pencil sketches. American Folklore appeared in Life as a 5 part series over a year and half, followed by the hard cover book, The Life Treasury of American Folklore, featuring additional paintings created just for the book. Lillian worked side by side with Jim during this time, assisting with in depth research and studio support, including hand mixing the egg tempera paints for the gessoed panels and completing preparatory drawings.

Maps
Pictorial map making was also a staple of Jim’s repertoire, with Lillian assisting extensively.  Memorable examples include the poster The Fabulous Fifties, created for Time (magazine) in 1960, and resort and trail maps for the Stowe Ski Association, also from the sixties.  Maps also appeared in Christmas themes tracing the journey of Mary and Joseph to Egypt.

The Golden Bough
In 1969 Jim completed a series of illustrations for The Golden Bough by Sir James Frazer, centered on the beliefs, customs and traditions of cultures from around the world. For this assignment Jim worked in a freer style, overlaying fine, fluid line drawings on abstract patterned fields of color, to suggest the mystery and mood of ancient and tribal rituals.

Bibliography

Major Book Illustration Projects
 Frazer, Sir James (1970). The Golden Bough. Limited Editions Club (see The Heritage Press).
 Turnbull, Agnes Sligh (1964). Little Christmas. The Riverside Press (now Riverside Publishing, a subsidiary of Houghton Mifflin Harcourt).
 Dolch, E. & M. (1964). Stories From Old Russia. Garrard Publishing Company.
 The Life Treasury of American Folklore (1960). Time Life.
 Miracle of the Sea - Evolution and The Atmosphere (1955). The World We Live In (Life magazine). Simon & Schuster, Inc.
 Lewicki, Lillian (1963). The Golden Book of Christmas Tales, Legends From Many Lands. Golden Press (now Western Publishing).
 Swan, Robert W. (1939). From Village to Metropolis. Grosset & Dunlap.

In the Collections Of
 Museum of Fine Arts, Boston - From Village to Metropolis 1939 original illustrations, book dummy, sketches and supporting letters
 The Lilly Library of Indiana University - Original paintings and research from the Life American Folklore magazine series and book
 La Jolla Map and Atlas Museum, La Jolla, California - Original paintings and printed pictorial maps for LIFE magazine, Stowe Ski Association, Map of Antarctica for Liberty magazine and others.
 The New York Public Library Main Branch - Stephen A. Schwarzman Building, Lionel Pincus and Princess Firyal Map Division - pictorial maps by James
 New Britain Museum of American Art - Miracle of the Sea cover painting for The World We Live In Life magazine series (Feb. 9, 1953)
 Society of Illustrators - Rip Van Winkle large pencil sketch from the Life American Folklore series
 Originally purchased by Clare Booth Luce - Christmas illustrations from The Golden Book of Christmas

Periodicals Featuring James' Work
Life (magazine), Collier's, The Saturday Evening Post, The New York Times, Daily News Record, Look (American magazine), Woman’s Home Companion, House Beautiful, Liberty (general interest magazine), Redbook, Horizon (U.S. magazine), Pageant (magazine), Skyways, The American Weekly, The American Home, Holiday (magazine), Better Homes and Gardens (magazine), Flower Grower, Ski Magazine, Scientific American, Ford Times, Good Housekeeping, Smithsonian (magazine), Boys' Life, Christian Herald, Rotary International, The Lamp, Blue Book (magazine), Woman’s Day, Coronet (magazine), Reader’s Digest, Yankee (magazine) and others.

Book References
 Dunbier, Lonnie Pierson (Editor). The Artists' Bluebook: 34,000 North American Artists to March 2005. (AskART.com, Inc., 2005)
 Davenport, Ray. Davenport's Art Reference: The Gold Edition. 2005.
 The Illustrator in America, 1860-2000 The Society of Illustrators by  Walter Reed (2001).
 Who's Who in American Art, 1564–1975, 3 volumes edited by Peter Falk
 Cohn, Jan. Covers of the Saturday Evening Post: Seventy Years of Outstanding Illustration.
 Dictionary of Signatures & Monograms by Peter Falk
 Opitz, Glenn B. (Editor), Mantle Fielding's Dictionary of American Painters, Sculptors & Engravers. 1986.
 Two Hundred Years of American Illustration from  The Society of Illustrators by Henry Pitz (artwork by Albino Hinojosa).

Feature Magazine Articles
 American Artists Magazine - feature article, The Importance of Thorough Research. December 1962.
 North Light Magazine - feature article. Winter 1971.
 American Artists Magazine - feature article, collaboration with printmaker Harry Hoehn, demonstrating dry lithography, an innovative paper based process). January 1973.

References

American artists
1979 deaths
1917 births